Aaron Michael Davies (born February 7, 1984) is an American actor. He is best known for playing the role of Griff in Another Gay Sequel: Gays Gone Wild in 2008. He has been in a few short movies as well as teen.comTV's Haute & Bothered.

Filmography

References

External links

1984 births
American male film actors
Living people
People from Hampton, Iowa
American male television actors